Elinor Lander Horwitz (born March 1929) is an American author of young adult and adult books. She lives in Chevy Chase, Maryland.

Mountain People, Mountain Crafts was on The New York Times' list of "Outstanding Books." "When the Sky is Like Lace" was on the New York Times' list of "Outstanding Books" of the year.

Personal life
After graduating from Smith College, Horwitz wrote book reviews and features for the Washington Star News and for many national magazines. She married neurosurgeon Norman Horwitz.

Horwitz is the mother of the late Pulitzer Prize-winning journalist and author Tony Horwitz and the mother-in-law of Pulitzer Prize-winning journalist and author Geraldine Brooks.

Selected works
The Strange Story of the Frog Who Became a Prince 
The Soothsayer's Handbook: A Guide to Bad Signs & Good Vibrations 
Communes in America: The Place Just Right 
Capital Punishment, U.S.A. 
Mountain People, Mountain Crafts 
Contemporary American Folk Artists 
A Child's Garden of Sculpture: Photographed at the Hirshhorn Museum and Sculpture Garden, Smithsonian Institution 
The Bird, the Banner, and Uncle Sam: Images of America in Folk and Popular Art 
Madness, Magic, and Medicine: The Treatment and Mistreatment of the Mentally Ill 
On the Land: The Evolution of American Agriculture 
Our Nation's Lakes 
Our Nation's Wetlands
Sometimes It Happens 
How to Wreck a Building 
When the Sky is Like Lace

References

1929 births
Living people
20th-century American writers
20th-century American women writers
21st-century American women